First Presbyterian Church is a historic church in Waurika, Oklahoma. It was built in 1908 and added to the National Register of Historic Places in 2002.

It is a one-story brick building with a side tower.  It featured green-painted wood shingles in its gable ends and on the tower.  Wide, overhanging boxed eaves seem to be consistent with Prairie School style.  It has fifty-six-over-one windows on the front, fifty-six-over-four windows on the side, and one-over-one windows on the back.

It was designed by Amarillo, Texas architect J.C. Berry.

When listed in 2001, the building was owned by the city of Waurika and had not operated as a church since the 1980s.

References

Presbyterian churches in Oklahoma
Churches on the National Register of Historic Places in Oklahoma
Churches completed in 1908
Buildings and structures in Jefferson County, Oklahoma
National Register of Historic Places in Jefferson County, Oklahoma
1908 establishments in Oklahoma